Gustav Reidar Birkeland (born 19 November 1928) is a Norwegian veterinarian.

He was born in Sauda, and took the dr.med.vet. degree in 1955. He was a lecturer in surgery at the Norwegian School of Veterinary Science from 1959 to 1984, and then professor from 1985 to 1994. He also served as dean there from 1983 to 1988. He holds an honorary degree from Helsinki, bestowed 1995.

References

1928 births
Living people
People from Sauda
Norwegian veterinarians
Academic staff of the Norwegian School of Veterinary Science
Rectors of the Norwegian School of Veterinary Science